5012 Eurymedon  is a mid-sized Jupiter trojan from the Greek camp, approximately  in diameter. It was discovered during the Palomar–Leiden survey at the Palomar Observatory in 1960. The carbonaceous C-type asteroid has a tentative rotation period of 46 hours. It was named from Greek mythology after Eurymedon.

Discovery 

Eurymedon was discovered on 17 October 1960, by Dutch astronomers Ingrid and Cornelis van Houten at Leiden, on photographic plates taken by Tom Gehrels at the Palomar Observatory in California. 
The body's observation arc begins with a precovery taken at Palomar in February 1954, or more than 6 years prior to its official discovery observation.

Palomar–Leiden survey 

The survey designation "P-L" stands for "Palomar–Leiden", named after Palomar and Leiden observatories, which collaborated on the fruitful Palomar–Leiden survey in the 1960s. Gehrels used Palomar's Samuel Oschin telescope –also known as the 48-inch Schmidt Telescope – and shipped the photographic plates to Ingrid and Cornelis van Houten at Leiden Observatory where astrometry was carried out. The trio are credited with the discovery of several thousand asteroids.

Orbit and classification 

Eurymedon is a carbonaceous Jupiter trojan in a 1:1 orbital resonance with Jupiter. It is located in the leading Greek camp at the Gas Giant's  Lagrangian point, 60° ahead of its orbit . It is also a non-family asteroid in the Jovian background population. This asteroid orbits the Sun at a distance of 4.8–5.7 AU once every 12 years and 1 month (4,417 days; semi-major axis of 5.27 AU). Its orbit has an eccentricity of 0.09 and an inclination of 5° with respect to the ecliptic.

Naming 

This minor planet was named after Eurymedon a servant to the Greek king Nestor during the Trojan War. The official naming citation was published by the Minor Planet Center on 16 May 1992.

Physical characteristics 

In the SDSS-based taxonomy, Eurymedon is a C-type asteroid. It has also been characterized as a carbonaceous C-type by Pan-STARRS's survey, while he dominant spectral type among the larger Jupiter trojans is that of D-types.

Rotation period 

In April 2016, a rotational lightcurve of Eurymedon was obtained from only two nights of photometric observations by Linda French and Robert Stephens using the 4-meter Víctor M. Blanco Telescope at Cerro Tololo Inter-American Observatory in Chile. Lightcurve analysis gave a tentative rotation period of  hours with a brightness amplitude of 0.3 magnitude. As of 2018, no refined period determination from follow-up observations has been published.

Diameter and albedo 

According to the survey carried out by the NEOWISE mission of NASA's Wide-field Infrared Survey Explorer, Eurymedon measures 36.96 kilometers in diameter and its surface has an albedo of 0.082, while the Collaborative Asteroid Lightcurve Link assumes a standard albedo for a carbonaceous asteroid of 0.057 and calculates a diameter of 44.22 kilometers based on an absolute magnitude of 10.5.

Notes

References

External links 
 Asteroid Lightcurve Database (LCDB), query form (info )
 Dictionary of Minor Planet Names, Google books
 Discovery Circumstances: Numbered Minor Planets (5001)-(10000) – Minor Planet Center
 
 

005012
Discoveries by Cornelis Johannes van Houten
Discoveries by Ingrid van Houten-Groeneveld
Discoveries by Tom Gehrels
9507
Named minor planets
19601017